Teton Glacier is a mountain glacier located below the north face of Grand Teton in Grand Teton National Park, Wyoming, United States. Its neighbors are Mount Owen to the west and Teewinot Mountain to the north. Teton Glacier is the largest of the twelve named glaciers in the park.

References

See also
 List of glaciers in the United States

Glaciers of Grand Teton National Park